John William Gulland (1864 – 26 January 1920) was a British Liberal Party politician.

Life

Gulland entered Parliament as Member for Dumfries Burghs at the 1906 general election. He was a junior Lord of the Treasury from 1909 until 1915, when he was promoted to Parliamentary Secretary to the Treasury (Chief Whip) upon the unexpected death of Percy Illingworth. However, the Coalition Government that formed in May resulted in his sharing the post with the Conservative Lord Edmund Talbot until Asquith's Liberals left the government in 1916.

He was made a Privy Counsellor in 1917. When his constituency was abolished in 1918, he contested Dumfriesshire, but was defeated by William Murray.

He lived at 8 Claremont Crescent in north-east Edinburgh.

He died in 1920. He is buried with his family in the south-east corner of Grange Cemetery in Edinburgh, facing the south path. His nephew John Masson Gulland, killed in the Goswick rail crash, lies with him, as does his wife, Edith Mary Allen.

References

External links 
 

1864 births
1920 deaths
Members of the Privy Council of the United Kingdom
Scottish Liberal Party MPs
UK MPs 1906–1910
UK MPs 1910
UK MPs 1910–1918